The 2004 World Interuniversity Games were the sixth edition of the Games (organised by IFIUS), and were held in Antwerp, Belgium.

External links
 Homepage IFIUS

World Interuniversity Games
World Interuniversity Games
World Interuniversity Games
International sports competitions hosted by Belgium
Multi-sport events in Belgium
Sports competitions in Antwerp
2000s in Antwerp